The House at 674 Elliot Drive is a historic home located at 674 Elliot Drive in Pasadena, California. The wood-frame house was built in 1911 for rancher Winslow B. Ross. Architect Arthur Heineman designed the home in the American Craftsman style. The front porch of the house is topped by a large gable supported by Tuscan columns and a patterned system of rafter trusses. Two patios are located on opposite sides of the house; the southeast patio adjoins a pergola-topped pathway through the yard. The house's roof features multiple low-pitched gables and open eaves with exposed rafter tails.

The house was added to the National Register of Historic Places on August 20, 2004.

References

Buildings and structures on the National Register of Historic Places in Pasadena, California
Houses on the National Register of Historic Places in California
Houses completed in 1911
Houses in Pasadena, California
American Craftsman architecture in California